Interstate City is a live album by American artist Dave Alvin and the Guilty Men, released in 1996. It was the group's first release and one of two the group released with Hightone records.

Reception

Writing for Allmusic, music critic Thom Owens wrote of the album "Most of the newer numbers are on par with his finest material and they are delivered with an intoxicating rush. Interstate City is one of the rare live albums that actually improves on the original recordings."

Track listing
All songs by Dave Alvin unless otherwise noted.
"So Long Baby, Goodbye" – 3:26
"Out in California" (Dave Alvin, Tom Russell) – 4:26
"Interstate City" – 6:21
"Look Out (It Must Be Love)/Intro to Mister Lee" – 4:21
"Mister Lee" (Alvin, Fontaine Brown) – 5:04
"Thirty Dollar Room" (Alvin, David Amy) – 6:29
"Dry River" – 4:10
"Museum of Heart" – 4:34
"Waiting for the Hard Times to Go" (Jim Ringer) – 3:37
"Jubilee Train/Do Re Mi/Promised Land" – 9:15
"Long White Cadillac" – 7:43
"The New Florence Avenue Lullaby" – 2:28
"Romeo's Escape" – 8:58

Personnel
Dave Alvin – vocals, guitar
Rick Solem – piano, background vocals
Gregory Boaz – bass
Bobby Lloyd Hicks – drums, percussion, background vocals
Donald Lindley – drums, percussion, background vocals
Greg Leisz – guitar, lap steel guitar, mandolin
Katy Moffatt – vocals
Ted Roddy – harmonica

Production notes
James Tuttle – engineer, mixing
Phil Crumrine – assistant engineer
Chris Bellman – mastering
Lou Beach – design
Issa Sharp – photography
Brenda Burns Boaz – photography

References

1996 live albums
Dave Alvin albums
HighTone Records albums